Station F is a business incubator for startups, located in 13th arrondissement of Paris. It is noted as the world's largest startup facility.

Situated in a former rail freight depot previously known as la Halle Freyssinet (thereof the "F" in Station F). The  facility was formally opened by President Emmanuel Macron in June 2017 and provides office accommodation for up to 1,000 start-up and early stage businesses as well as for corporate partners such as Facebook, Microsoft and Naver.

Building facilities
Station F occupies a building designed by French engineer Eugène Freyssinet. First opened in 1929, the former rail depot has been extensively remodeled by architects Wilmotte and Associates to meet the needs of small start-up companies.

As well as 3,000 desk spaces and private meeting facilities, the incubator also hosts a 370-seat auditorium and dining facilities open to the public. Facebook's own Startup Garage in the building will host up to 15 companies on a six monthly cycle and represents the company's first physical space dedicated to startups.

This giant food court comprises five different Italian eateries.

Partnerships 
Station F has a number of partnerships for start up programs geared for entrepreneurs.  Partners include Facebook, Google Microsoft, Ubisoft, and Zendesk.

As of August 2020, the following partners were hosting startups programs within Station F:

 ADN_ x IFM
 Arts & Métiers
 Ashoka
 BNP Paribas
 HEC Paris (Incubateur HEC Paris)
 EDHEC
 Entrepreneur First
 Facebook
 INSEAD
 Impulse Lab
 Havas Group
 iPEPS / ICM
 L'Oréal
 LVMH
 Microsoft
 Moove Lab
 Naver / Line
 Outre-Mer Network
 Pépite Starter IDF
 Ponts Alumni
 ShakeUp Factory
 TF1
 Thales
 Ubisoft
 Veepee
 Zendesk

Station F awards 
Station F awards different prizes each year to the startups on its campus :

 Station F Top 30
 Future 40

References 

Business incubators of France
Buildings and structures in the 13th arrondissement of Paris
Repurposed railway stations in Europe